Ruaha may refer to:

 Ruaha (Iringa Urban ward), a district in Iringa Region of Tanzania.
 Ruaha National Park, a park in Tanzania.
 The Great Ruaha River in Tanzania.